Sweden competed at the 2000 Summer Paralympics in Sydney, Australia, from 18 October to 29 October 2000.

Medalists

Competitors

At the 200 Paralympic Games Sweden sent 88 athletes competing for medals in 17 disciplines.

Archery

Roger Eriksson
Siv Thulin

Athletics

 Thomas Brandhild (F37 Discus, Shot put)
 Magnus Bärtfors (T20 1500m)
 Sofia Dettmann (T54 100m, 200m, 400m, 800m)
 Håkan Ericsson (T54, 100m, 200m, 400m)
 Klas Ersson (F20 High jump)
 Viktor Göransson (F42 Long jump, F42 100m)
 Tim Johansson (T51 200m, 400m, 800m, 1500m)
 Christer Lenander (T38 100m, 200m)
 Andreas Nordin (F13 Discus, Shot put, Javelin)
 Kasper Nordlinder (T37 1500m, 5000m)
 Madelene Nordlund (T53 200m, 400m, 800m, 5000m, marathon)
 Hakan Sahlberg (F20 Javelin, Shot put)
 Per Vesterlund (T52 800m, 1500m, 5000m)
 Emil Oestberg (T13 5000m)

Equestrian

 Kerstin Englund 
 Ida Gustafsson
 Helena Hagberg 
 Ida Landahl 
 Sahra Rydh

Goalball

Men
 Jimmy Björkstrand
 Niklas Hultqvist
 Torsten Karlsson
 Boris Samuelsson
 Mikael Stahl
 Niklas Wetterström

Women
 Helena Gustavsson
 Malin Gustavsson
 Josefine Jälmestål
 Anna Nilsson
 Lena Saarensalo
 Sarah Winberg

Powerlifting

 Jonas Celin (men's 56 kg)

Sailing

 Carl-Gustaf Fresk (sonar)
 Lars Bagge (sonar)
 Jan-Olof Edbom (sonar)
 Lars Löfström (sonar)
 Claes Hultling (2.4 mR)

Shooting

 Jonas Jacobsson 
 Thomas Johansson 
 Anders Lundvall 
 Kenneth Pettersson 
 Björn Samuelsson

Swimming

 Karin Bergek
 Daniel Bergström 
 Sandra Eriksson 
 Stefan Larsson 
 David Lega 
 Nora Prochazka 
 Alex Racoveanu 
 Simon Åhlstad

Table tennis

 Fredrik Andersson
 Magnus Andrée 
 Robert Bader
 Ernst Bolldén 
 Johnny Eriksson
 Jan-Christer Gustavsson
 Simon Itkonen 
 Jörgen Johansson
 Mattias Karlsson
 Örjan Kylevik

Wheelchair basketball

 Enoch Ablorh
 Lars-Gunnar Andersson
 Gunnar Berglund 
 Daniel Flensburg
 Joachim Gustavsson 
 Hussein Haidari 
 Per Jameson 
 Peter Kohlström 
 Per Uhlen 
 Christian Wapner 
 Stefan Wegeborn 
 Thomas Åkerberg

Wheelchair rugby

 Tomas Engblom
 Thomas Eriksson 
 Magnus Gunnarsson 
 Ulf Josefsson 
 Per-Arne Kulle 
 Kristoffer Lindberg 
 Andreas Lundgren 
 Jan-Owe Mattsson
 Jesper Nilsson
 Magnus Olers 
 Loa Rissmar 
 Haci Sak

Wheelchair tennis

 Andreas Westman
 Peter Wikström

Notes

See also
Sweden at the 2000 Summer Olympics
Sweden at the Paralympics

Nations at the 2000 Summer Paralympics
2000
Paralympics